Jhootha Kahin Ka is a 2019 Indian Hindi-language comedy drama film directed by Smeep Kang, and produced by Deepak Mukut and Anuj Sharma and Vinay Gupta under the banners of Soham Rockstar Entertainment and Shantketan Entertainments. The film stars Rishi Kapoor, Jimmy Sheirgill, Lillete Dubey, Sunny Singh, Omkar Kapoor, Manoj Joshi, Pujita Ponnada and Nimisha Mehta, and follows the story of two boys Varun and Karan (Omkar and Sunny), who go to Mauritius for higher studies, where they change their lifestyle so much that they do not want to go back home. It was theatrically released in India on 19 July 2019.

Cast 
 Rishi Kapoor as Yograj Singh, Varun’s father 
 Jimmy Sheirgill as Tommy Pandey, Karan's brother
 Lillete Dubey as Ruchi Mehta (Riya's mother)
 Sunny Singh as Karan Pandey 
 Omkar Kapoor as Varun Singh
 Manoj Joshi as Vinod Mehta (Riya's father)
 Nimisha Mehta as Riya Mehta
 Rucha Vaidya as Sonam
 Rajesh Sharma as Kokey Singh, Varun's maternal uncle
 Ashok Pathak as Tommy Pandey's Side-Kick
 Rakesh Bedi as Sonam's father
 Neelu Kohli as Sonam's mother
 Sunny Leone (special appearance in song "Funk Love")
 Nataša Stanković (special appearance in song "Saturday Night")

Soundtrack

The music of the film is composed by 
Yo Yo Honey Singh,Amjad Nadeem-Aamir, Sanjeev-Ajay, Rahul Jain, Kashi Richard, Sidhant Madhav while lyrics are written by Sanjeev Chaturvedi, Alok Ranjan Jha, Amjad Nadeem and Lil Golu.

Production
The film is shot in Punjab, Mauritius, and Mumbai.

References

External links
 
 

2019 films
2010s Hindi-language films
Indian comedy-drama films
Films shot in Punjab, India
Films shot in Mauritius
Films shot in Mumbai
2019 comedy-drama films